Dineh Kabud (also Romanized as Dīneh Kabūd; also known as Dīneh Kabūd-e ‘Olyā) is a village in Shamsabad Rural District, in the Central District of Arak County, Markazi Province, Iran. At the 2006 census, its population was 434, in 125 families.

References 

Populated places in Arak County